Antonio Vas (born 29 December 1964), is an Indian politician from Goa. He is the current member of Goa Legislative Assembly representing the Cortalim Assembly constituency. Vas contested as an Independent candidate in 2022 Goa Legislative Assembly election and emerged victorious. He defeated two term Aam Aadmi Party MLA, Alina Saldanha by a margin of 4167 votes.

Early and personal life
Antonio Vas was born to Mateus Vas in Goa. He completed his Secondary School Certificate from Our Lady of Perpetual Succor High School, Cortalim in 1986. He currently resides at Arvale, Cortalim, Goa. He is a bus operator and fish trader by profession.

References

1964 births
Living people
Goa MLAs 2022–2027